M&M may refer to:

 M&M's, a chocolate confectionery coated with hard candy shell and letter m
 M&M Boys, the nickname given to baseball players Mickey Mantle and Roger Maris
 M&M Food Market, a specialty frozen food store chain in Canada
 M&M Enterprises, a fictional company from Catch-22

Music
 M&M Studios, a Spanish-dubbing studio
 "M+M's", a song by the American band Blink-182 from Cheshire Cat
 Marcus & Martinus, a Norwegian pop duo (styled as M&M)
 Martha and the Muffins, a Canadian pop band
 Morales and Munzibai, a dance remix and production duo of the 1980s
 Morrissey–Mullen, a British jazz-funk band
 M&M, former stage name of rapper Eminem
 "M&M's", song by Migos from the mixtape No Label 2

Science and medicine
 Modigliani–Miller theorem, an economic theorem of capital structure
 Morbidity and mortality conference, peer reviews of mistakes in practice of medical services
 McIntyre and McKitrick (2003 and 2005), critiques of "hockey stick graph" temperature reconstructions

Games
 Might and Magic, a series of computer role-playing games
 Mutants & Masterminds, a role playing game

Other uses
 McClintic-Marshall House, a Lehigh University living unit
 Mahindra & Mahindra, an Indian multinational automobile manufacturing corporation
 The Master and Margarita, novel by Russian writer Mikhail Bulgakov
 Men & Motors, a British TV channel
 Mountain and moorland pony breeds, a group of pony types native to the British Isles
 Mia and Me, a German children's series created by Gerhard Hahn

See also 
 MM (disambiguation)
 MNM (disambiguation)
 Morbidity and mortality (disambiguation)